Wattled bulbul may refer to:

 Blue-wattled bulbul, a species of bird found in Borneo and Sumatra
 Yellow-wattled bulbul, a species of bird found in the Philippines

Birds by common name